The European Federation of National Youth Orchestras (EFNYO) is the association of the national youth orchestras of Europe. Its mission statement is to "provide a unique platform for the exchange of experience in orchestra training". It is co-funded by the Creative Europe Programme of the European Union.

EFNYO is a member of the European Music Council, International Music Council, Jeunesses Musicales International and Culture Action Europe.

Members
Members as of December 2020.

National youth orchestras

International orchestras

Organisations 
 Britten-Pears Orchestra
 Live Music Now Scotland
 Young Euro Classic

See also 
 List of youth orchestras

References

External links
EFNYO official website

Pan-European music organizations
European Union youth policy
European youth orchestras
Music and the European Union
National youth orchestras
Youth orchestras
Musical groups established in 1994
International organisations based in Vienna
Youth organizations established in 1994
1994 establishments in Austria